Casualty of war or Casualties of war may refer to:

Entertainment
Casualties of War, a 1989 film directed by Brian De Palma, and starring Michael J. Fox and Sean Penn
Casualties of War (Doctor Who), a BBC Books original novel written by Steve Emmerson 
Casualties of War (album), a 2007 album by Hip Hop supergroup Boot Camp Clik
"Casualties of War" by Eric B. & Rakim

See also

Statistics
 Casualties of the 2006 Lebanon War
 Casualties of the Iraq War
 Casualties of the Second Chechen War
 Civilian casualties of the War in Afghanistan (2001–present)
 List of wars by death toll
 Ottoman casualties of World War I
 United States military casualties of war
 World War I casualties
 World War II casualties

Related terms
 Casualty (person)
 Civilian casualties
 Collateral damage
 Conflict epidemiology
 Fragging
 Friendly fire